The Landsmannschaft der Deutschen aus Ungarn or Homeland Society of Germans from Hungary ("Homeland Association of Germans from Hungary") is an organization which represents ethnic German refugees expelled from their homes in Hungary to western Germany during World War II and its aftermath.

The organization is based in Munich, Bavaria. Its Bundesvorsitzender (chairman) is Dr. Friedrich A. Zimmermann.

Notes

See also 
 Flight and expulsion of Germans (1944–1950)

External links 
 Official website 

Organizations established in 1949
Landsmannschaften